II D Extreme was an American new jack swing R&B group from the early 1990s that included D'Extra Wiley, Randy Gill (Johnny Gill's brother) and Jermaine Mickey. They are known for the songs "Cry No More", "Up on the Roof" and their cover of the Gap Band's song "Outstanding". Their personal manager was Freda Mays.

History

Discography

References

American hip hop groups
MCA Records artists
Musical groups established in 1993
American contemporary R&B musical groups
New jack swing music groups
Musical groups disestablished in 1996
Musical groups from Washington, D.C.